Widin was the last attested Ostrogothic noble in Italy. After Teia's defeat at the hands of the Byzantine eunuch general Narses at the Battle of Mons Lactarius, south of present-day Naples, in October 552 or early 553, organized Ostrogothic resistance ended. Widin, however, was able to organize a Gothic revolt in northern Italy in 561. According to Paul the Deacon, Widin comes Gothorum and Amingus, a Frank, rebelled against Narses. 

Widin was captured in 562 and sent to Constantinople. After that, the Ostrogoths faded in obscurity.

References

Sources

6th-century Ostrogothic people
Gothic warriors
People of the Gothic War (535–554)